Joseph Jonathan Davenport (born March 24, 1976) is a former Major League Baseball pitcher who played for two seasons. He played for the Chicago White Sox in 1999 and the Colorado Rockies in 2001.

A single for Colorado in his only turn at-bat left Davenport with a rare MLB career batting average of 1.000.

References

External links

1976 births
Living people
American expatriate baseball players in Taiwan
Baseball players from Chicago
Birmingham Barons players
Charlotte Knights players
Chicago White Sox players
Colorado Rockies players
Colorado Springs Sky Sox players
Gulf Coast Blue Jays players
Hagerstown Suns players
Long Island Ducks players
Major League Baseball pitchers
St. Catharines Stompers players
Uni-President Lions players
Winston-Salem Warthogs players
Yuma Scorpions players